Josefina Brdlíková née Mourková (20 March 1843   – 21 April 1910) was a translator, singer, pianist and composer. She was born in Prague, and studied music in Paris and London. She married the mayor and industrialist Jan Brdlík, who was a founder of coal tar chemical factories, and lived in Počátky until 1899.  In 1894 her husband opened a new branch of his business and the couple moved to Kralupy.

After her husband died, Brdlíková returned to Prague, where she studied astronomy and languages. She composed, wrote and translated, and performed as a singer and pianist. She died in Prague.

Works
Selected works include:
Aphorismen in Walzerform, for piano four-hands (pub. 1897)

References

1843 births
1910 deaths
19th-century classical composers
20th-century classical composers
Czech Romantic composers
Women classical composers
Austro-Hungarian expatriates in France
Austro-Hungarian expatriates in the United Kingdom
20th-century women composers
19th-century women composers